Oxalis ambigua is a species from the subgenus Oxalis.

Taxonomy
The taxon name Oxalis ambigua was first described by Nikolaus Joseph von Jacquin. Different ranking exists. The species is either from the subgenus Oxalis or from the genus Oxalis.

Range
Recent observations suggest that Oxalis ambigua is currently primarily found in South Africa. Botanic expedition in the 19th century also mention observations in New Zealand.

References

ambigua